The 2021–22 season was the 120th season in the existence of Brighton & Hove Albion and the club's fifth consecutive season in the top flight of English football. In addition to the domestic league, Brighton & Hove Albion participated in this season's edition of the FA Cup and in the EFL Cup, where they exited both competitions in the fourth round. Brighton finished the season in ninth, their highest ever finish in the top flight.

Summary 

Brighton played three pre-season friendlies, the first coming against Rangers at Ibrox on 24 July where it finished in a goalless draw, with former Albion player Connor Goldson being the main attraction of the fixture. Their second friendly fixture came a week later, away at Luton Town with former Seagulls player and coach Nathan Jones managing The Hatters. Brighton prevailed, winning 3–1 with goals from Aaron Connolly, new summer signing Enock Mwepu and Percy Tau finding the net for the first time in an Albion shirt. Brighton's last pre-season friendly came on 7 August and the only friendly being played at home. With the return of most first team players including the likes of captain Lewis Dunk and Leandro Trossard, Albion fell to a 2–0 defeat to La Liga side Getafe.

Albion won their opening match of the season coming from behind to win 2–1 against Burnley at Turf Moor with goals from Neal Maupay and Alexis Mac Allister. Summer signing Enock Mwepu made his Brighton and Premier League debut with Shane Duffy making his first Albion appearance since the 2019–20 season. Brighton beat Watford 2–0 on 21 August, in the second match of the season with this being their best start in a top-flight campaign. It was also Albion's first match in front of a full stadium since March 2020.

Potter fielded a team of an average age of 20.5 years in the second round EFL Cup tie over Cardiff City with Jakub Moder and Andi Zeqiri grabbing their first Brighton goals in the 2–0 away win.

Brighton's first loss came on 28 August, a 2–0 home loss against Everton with Taylor Richards making his Albion league and Premier League debut. In the first derby game against bitter rivals Crystal Palace of the season away at Selhurst Park on 27 September, Brighton were trailing after Leandro Trossard conceded a penalty in which Wilfried Zaha scored and took Crystal Palace 1–0 up at the break. However, Joël Veltman hit a long ball into Neal Maupay from a poor Vicente Guaita goal kick and Maupay lobbed the keeper and scored a 90+5th minute equaliser taking a point back to Sussex.

Brighton's second loss of the Premier League season came on 23 October, in their ninth game, losing 4–1 at home with Manchester City winning comfortably, scoring their first three goals in the space of 18 minutes. Four days later, Brighton were knocked of the EFL Cup, losing away to Leicester City on penalties after a 2–2 draw in which Mwepu scored his first goal for the club. Jürgen Locadia also made his first start – and only his second appearance – for the club in over two years. Three days later, away at Liverpool Brighton came from 2–0 down to draw 2–2, with Mwepu again on the scoresheet adding his first league goal for the club.

Potter made his 100th appearance as Brighton manager on 20 November, in the 2–0 away defeat against Aston Villa.

On 6 December, Brighton were drawn away to West Bromwich Albion in the third round FA Cup draw, which will be played on 8 January 2022. Albion's Premier League fixture with Tottenham Hotspur set to be played on 12 December was postponed three days prior to the match with Spurs having high numbers of Covid-19 cases. Brighton returned to action on 15 December, a midweek 1–0 home loss against Wolves, with several absences due to Covid, injury and suspension before the fixture against Manchester United scheduled for 18 December was also postponed, this time two days prior to kick off with Covid cases in both squads.

After a 12 game winless run dating back to 19 September, Brighton were able to hit two against Brentford without reply on Boxing Day and move back into the top half of the table. The result also meant that the Seagulls won the double over The Bees after beating them in the earlier away fixture in September.

Brighton beat West Brom in the third round of the FA Cup on 8 January 2022, with Odel Offiah making his first start for the club in the eventual 2–1 after extra-time away victory. Keeper Kjell Scherpen made his Albion debut in this game.

In the reverse fixture against Palace on 15 January, Pascal Groß had a penalty saved from Eagles keeper Jack Butland to deny Brighton of going 1–0 up. Maupay had a goal disallowed for a high boot on Butland moments later in the eventual 1–1 draw. Brighton got the equaliser through a Joachim Andersen own goal in the 87th minute thanks to a low pacey pass in front of goal from Maupay. 

Brighton were knocked out of the FA Cup in the fourth round after losing 3–1 at Tottenham on 5 February after a Harry Kane double and a Solly March own goal, with Yves Bissouma giving Albion hope before Kane scored his second.
Brighton's record-breaking unbeaten league run of seven matches was ended on 15 February, in Potter's 100th league game in charge, losing 2–0 away to Manchester United at Old Trafford. Dunk was sent off shortly after Uniteds''' opener. He was originally shown a yellow card by referee Peter Bankes, however, Bankes went to VAR and deemed Dunk to have denied Anthony Elanga a run on goal 

After six straight defeats Brighton ended the run with a somewhat disappointing draw with Norwich City on 2 April, finishing 0–0 at home with a Neal Maupay penalty being stuck over the bar. A week later Brighton ended their run of seven games without a win in style, with a 2–1 away win over Arsenal. Mwepu scored and assisted on his first start since a long period out injured, with Moisés Caicedo making his Premier League debut where he assisted Mwepu's goal. Seven days later Albion were up in North London again, this time enjoying their time at the Tottenham Hotspur Stadium with Trossard scoring a 90th minute – scoring two goals in as many games – as Brighton made it six games unbeaten in the capital. Albion beat Wolves 3–0 at Molineux Stadium on 30 April, taking their points tally to 44 points breaking their record of 41 points in a Premier League season. The win also meant they had won 10 Premier League matches throughout the campaign, beating their previous record of nine.

On 7 May, a brilliant Brighton demolished a dreadful Manchester United 4–0 at the AMEX, with Brighton's biggest ever top flight result being their first home victory of 2022, which was also infront of a record crowd, 31,637. Moisés Caicedo and Marc Cucurella scored their first Albion goals with Pascal Groß scoring his first goal of the campaign and Trossard scoring one and assisting two others as Brighton beat United for the first time in eight games, ending their chances for 2022–23 UEFA Champions League qualification. At Albions end of season awards, Marc Cucurealla won both Players' Player and Player of the Season in his debut season. Jeremy Sarmiento picked up Brighton's Young Player of the Season with Enock Mwepu winning The Seagulls Goal of the Season with his 20-yard strike against Liverpool in October. Brighton achieved their highest ever top flight finish, finishing in ninth place after beating West Ham 3–1 on the last game of the season, with Joël Veltman scoring his second ever goal for The Seagulls. The victory took their points tally to 51 points, 10 points higher than their previous record, and scoring 42 goals, their most in a Premier League season. This was also the first time since being in the Premier League where Brighton finished ahead of rivals Crystal Palace who finished in 12th.

Players

Transfers
Transfers in

Loans in

Loans out

Transfers out

Pre-season friendlies
The Seagulls announced friendly matches against Rangers, Luton Town and Getafe as part of their pre-season preparations.

Competitions
Overview

Premier League

League table

Results summary

Results by matchday

Matches
The league fixtures were announced on 16 June 2021.

FA Cup

Brighton were drawn away to West Bromwich Albion of the Championship on 6 December for the third round tie, which took place on 8 January 2022. The fourth round draw was held on 9 January, a day after Brighton's third round fixture in which they were drawn an away fixture against fellow Premier League side Tottenham Hotspur.

EFL Cup

Albion entered the competition in the second round stage and were drawn away to Cardiff City for the second round. In the third round draw Brighton were again to meet Welsh opposition again in Swansea City, this time at home. Brighton were drawn to an away fixture at Leicester City for 27 October, in their fourth round tie.

Squad statistics

|-
! colspan=14 style=background:#dcdcdc; text-align:center|Goalkeepers

|-

|-
! colspan=14 style=background:#dcdcdc; text-align:center|Defenders

|-
! colspan=14   style=background:#dcdcdc; text-align:center|Midfielders                 

  

|-
! colspan=14 style=background:#dcdcdc; text-align:center|Forwards
 

|-
! colspan=17 style=background:#dcdcdc; text-align:center| Players who left the club permanently or on loan during the season 

                                                                                                                                             

|}Note• Florin Andone joined La Liga side Cádiz on 23 August on a season-long loan.

• Percy Tau joined Egyptian side Al Ahly on 26 August on a permanent deal.

• Michał Karbownik joined Greek side Olympiacos on 27 August on a season-long loan deal.

• Christian Walton signed on a season-long deal with Ipswich Town on 30 August. On 19 January 2022, Walton signed a permanent deal with The Tractor Boys.

• Andi Zeqiri moved to Bundesliga side FC Augsburg on 30 August where he will spend the season on loan at the club.

• Moises Caicedo joined Belgian side Beerschot on a season-long loan deal on 31 August. However, he was recalled to Brighton from his loan on 12 January 2022. His appearances in table are his overall total in current player section and total before he went out on loan in players who left''' the club section. 

• Aaron Connolly joined EFL Championship side Middlesbrough on loan for the remainder of the season on 2 January 2022.

• Jürgen Locadia joined
Bundesliga club VfL Bochum on a permanent deal on 5 January 2022.

• Taylor Richards signed for Birmingham City on 8 January 2022 on a loan until the end of the season.

• Dan Burn signed for fellow Premier League side Newcastle United on a permanent deal on 31 January 2022.

• Kjell Scherpen joined Belgian side Oostende on loan for the remainder of the season on 31 January 2022.

End of season awards

Player of the Season – Marc Cucurella
 Players' Player of the Season – Marc Cucurella
Young Player of the Season – Jeremy Sarmiento
 Goal of the season – Enock Mwepu v Liverpool - Premier League, 30 October 2021

See also
 2021–22 in English football
 List of Brighton & Hove Albion F.C. seasons

References

Brighton & Hove Albion F.C. seasons
Brighton and Hove Albion
Brighton and Hove Albion